Annickia is a genus of plant in family Annonaceae. Every species of this genus is native to continental Africa, from west Tropical Africa to Tanzania.

Species
As accepted by Kew;
 Annickia affinis (Exell) Versteegh & Sosef
 Annickia ambigua (Robyns & Ghesq.) Setten & Maas
 Annickia atrocyanescens (Robyns & Ghesq.) Setten & Maas
 Annickia chlorantha (Oliv.) Setten & Maas
 Annickia kummeriae (Engl. & Diels) Setten & Maas
 Annickia kwiluensis (Robyns & Ghesq.) Setten & Maas
 Annickia lebrunii (Robyns & Ghesq.) Setten & Maas
 Annickia letestui (Le Thomas) Setten & Maas
 Annickia olivacea (Robyns & Ghesq.) Setten & Maas
 Annickia pilosa (Exell) Setten & Maas
 Annickia polycarpa (DC.) Setten & Maas ex I.M.Turner

A revision of the genus Annickia was carried out in 2007.

References

Annonaceae
Annonaceae genera
Flora of West Tropical Africa
Flora of Tanzania
Taxonomy articles created by Polbot